The Rising Tide (2006) is the first novel of a continuing series by Jeff Shaara based on certain theaters of World War II. It was published on November 7, 2006.

It covers the North African Campaign from its position in late May to Rommel's defeat. It also covers Operation Husky in Italy. The main characters are Erwin Rommel, Dwight D. Eisenhower, and two young soldiers named Jack Logan and Sergeant Jesse Adams. Jack Logan was a tank gunner who was eventually taken as a prisoner of war by the Axis but then freed by Allied forces.

The book became a New York Times bestseller and a Wall Street Journal bestseller less than a month after being published, debuting at number eight on both newspapers.

External links
 Interview with Jeff Shaara at the Pritzker Military Library

2006 American novels
Novels set during World War II
Novels by Jeffrey Shaara
Novels set in Africa
Novels set in Italy
Ballantine Books books